Lin Xiyu (林希妤) (born 25 February 1996), also known as Xi Yu Lin, is a Chinese professional golfer.

Lin turned professional in 2011 and began playing on the China LPGA Tour. She has won seven times on the CLPGA. She began playing on the Ladies European Tour in 2013 and has two wins on the tour the Sanya Ladies Open in 2014 and 2015. She began playing on the LPGA Tour in 2014 with a best finish of T-5 at the 2015 Blue Bay LPGA.

Lin has made multiple holes-in-one on the LPGA Tour.

Lin competed at the 2016 Summer Olympics, finishing 38th.

Lin also uses Janet as her first name.

Professional wins

Ladies European Tour wins
2014 Sanya Ladies Open^
2015 Sanya Ladies Open^

China LPGA Tour wins
2012 (2) Tian Jing Challenge, Srixon XXIO Ladies Open
2013 (1) Sanya's Hills Ladies Classic
2014 (2) Sanya's Hills Ladies Classic, Sanya Ladies Open^
2015 (1) Sanya Ladies Open^
2019 (1) Macalline Women's China Open

^ Co-sanctioned by Ladies European Tour, Ladies Asian Golf Tour and China LPGA Tour.

ALPG Tour wins
2018 ALPG Ballarat Icons Pro Am

Playoff record
LPGA Tour playoff record (0–1)

World ranking
Position in Women's World Golf Rankings at the end of each calendar year.

Team appearances
Professional
International Crown (representing China): 2016

References

External links

Chinese female golfers
LPGA Tour golfers
Ladies European Tour golfers
Olympic golfers of China
Golfers at the 2016 Summer Olympics
Golfers at the 2020 Summer Olympics
Asian Games medalists in golf
Asian Games silver medalists for China
Golfers at the 2010 Asian Games
Medalists at the 2010 Asian Games
Sportspeople from Guangzhou
1996 births
Living people
20th-century Chinese women
21st-century Chinese women